The men's 5000 metres event at the 2021 European Athletics U23 Championships was held in Tallinn, Estonia, at Kadriorg Stadium on 10 July.

Records
Prior to the competition, the records were as follows:

Results

References

5000 metres
5000 metres at the European Athletics U23 Championships